Russula risigallina is a species of mushroom. It was previously known as R. chamaeleontina. It is a small yellow russula that is edible and good-tasting, although identifying the species correctly can be difficult.
This mushroom can be found in various countries throughout Europe.

See also
 List of Russula species

References

risigallina
Fungi described in 1786
Fungi of Europe
Edible fungi